is a former Grand Prix motorcycle road racer from Japan. He enjoyed his best season in 1995 when he finished the season in fourth place in the 125cc world championship.

References 

1963 births
Sportspeople from Aichi Prefecture
Japanese motorcycle racers
125cc World Championship riders
Living people